Derek Hall (born 29 November 1970) is a former Australian rules footballer who played with the West Coast Eagles and Geelong in the Australian Football League (AFL).

Early life
A basketball player in his youth, Hall was brought up in the Western Australian town of Harvey. Although he was picked up by West Coast in the 1990 AFL draft, Hall continued playing for West Perth in the WAFL. Hall, a strong marking forward, had to wait until 1993 to break into the AFL and made two appearances. He spent 1994 in the WAFL and topped West Perth's goal-kicking for the second time.

Career
Hall nominated for the pre-season draft in 1994 and secured with the 16th selection by Geelong. He was used both as a forward and in the midfield by his new club. In 1996 he missed just one game, played in a qualifying final, had 334 disposals and kicked 24 goals. He also had 144 marks, which was the most by a Geelong player that season and was selected in Western Australia's State of Origin team. The following year he again performed well, kicking a further 26 goals and averaging 17.88 disposals a game.

He returned to the WAFL after leaving Geelong and played at Peel Thunder.

Hall was playing coach of Mooroopna in the Goulburn Valley Football Netball League from 2005 to 2007. He then coached Katandra in the Picola & District Football League until 2010, taking them a grand final in 2008 and preliminary finals the following two years.

References

1970 births
Australian rules footballers from Western Australia
West Coast Eagles players
Geelong Football Club players
West Perth Football Club players
Peel Thunder Football Club players
Mooroopna Football Club players
People from Harvey, Western Australia
Western Australian State of Origin players
Living people